Kyle Norris (born March 12, 1990) is a former Canadian football linebacker. He was drafted 24th overall by the Edmonton Eskimos in the 2013 CFL Draft. Norris played CIS football with the Saint Mary's Huskies.

College career
Norris played for the Saint Mary's Huskies from 2009 to 2012, appearing in 32 games. Norris attended the U Sports East-West Bowl in 2012 and was invited to the CFL Combine in 2013. He recorded a career total of 101 tackles, 13 tackles for loss, 5 sacks, and 2 interceptions.

Professional career

Edmonton Eskimos
Norris was drafted 24th overall (3rd round) by the Edmonton Eskimos in the 2013 CFL Draft. He appeared in eight regular season games recording 5 special teams tackles and a forced fumble. He was released by the Eskimos on June 22, 2014.

Winnipeg Blue Bombers
Norris was signed by the Winnipeg Blue Bombers on June 23, 2014. He appeared in ten regular season games and recorded 2 special teams tackles.

Montreal Alouettes
Norris was claimed off the Winnipeg Blue Bombers practice roster by the Alouettes on November 5, 2014. He appeared in one regular season game and two playoff games recording 2 special teams tackles. He was released by the Alouettes on June 4, 2015.

Saskatchewan Roughriders
Norris was signed to the Saskatchewan Roughriders roster on October 29, 2015. He appeared in one regular season game recording 1 special teams tackle. He was released by the Roughriders on December 15, 2015.

References

External links
Montreal Alouettes bio

1990 births
Living people
Players of Canadian football from Ontario
Canadian football linebackers
Saint Mary's Huskies football players
Edmonton Elks players
Winnipeg Blue Bombers players
Montreal Alouettes players
Canadian football people from Ottawa